Clifty, formerly called Lickskillet, is an unincorporated community in Todd County, Kentucky, United States.

Geography
Clifty is located in the northern portion of Todd County at the junction of Kentucky Routes 107, 181, and 890.

Post office
Clifty has a post office with ZIP code 42216.

References

Unincorporated communities in Todd County, Kentucky
Unincorporated communities in Kentucky